Trichoplusia lectula is a moth of the family Noctuidae first described by Francis Walker in 1858. It is found throughout Asia, including the Indian subregion, Sri Lanka, Thailand, Borneo, Java, Japan, as well as Western Australia and Queensland.

Description
Its wingspan is about 28 mm. Palpi with short third joint. Hind femur of male not tufted with long hair. Head and thorax dark reddish brown and greyish. Abdomen pale. Forewings dark red brown and purplish grey. An antemedial rufous line and a broad white streak found along median nervure and vein 2 as far as the postmedial line, which is bent outwards at vein 5, where a large red-brown patch can be seen above the streak. Reniform greyish with white lines on its inner and outer angle. Some reddish brown sub-marginal dentate marks found with a white streak below those near apex. A rufous submarginal line along with two fine marginal lines and a white line through the cilia can be seen. Hindwings pale fuscous.

The larvae feed on Mentha species.

References

External links
Australian Faunal Directory
Japanese Moths

Moths of Australia
Plusiinae
Moths of Japan
Moths of Indonesia
Moths of Asia
Moths described in 1858